Hinduism is a minority faith in Indian state of Nagaland followed by 8.75% of the population. There are 1,04,851 Hindus in Nagaland.

History
According to local legend, Dimapur, the largest city in Nagaland, is said to have been named after the Mahabharatha character Hidimba. It was earlier known as Hidimbapur, meaning the city of Hidimba. Hidimbapur came to be known as Dimbapur and then Dimapur. Another legend says that the Dimapur is a corruption of Hidimbapur, meaning the city of Hidimbi,the sister of Hidimba who later married the Pandava prince Bhima and gave birth to Ghatotkacha.

Demographics
Hindus constituted 14.36% of the state's population in 1981 census. The figure decreased to 7.70%  in the 2001 census. In the 2011 census, it increased slightly to 8.75%.  

Hindus are concentrated mainly in Dimapur District (28.75%), Kohima District (11.8%) and Niuland District (9.4%)

See also
 Hinduism in Manipur

Notes

References

Nagaland